The ISEQ 20 is a benchmark stock market index composed of companies that trade on Euronext Dublin. The index comprises the 20 companies with the highest trading volume and market capitalisation contained within the ISEQ Overall Index. The index was started on 31 December 2004 at a base of 1,000 points. The Irish Overall Index has a longer history and is more often used for comparing the performance of the Irish stocks for a longer period.

Due to the "Celtic Tiger" economy the index rose to just over 1500 points in April 2007, before declining sharply in the Irish financial crisis to under 300 points, since when it has recovered to over 1000 points

Since 2005 the ISEQ 20 index is covered by an ETF contract; other ETFs are also listed on the ISE.

Constituents
As of March 2021.

Previous constituents

References

External links
Official ISEQ 20 prices from Euronext
Official ISEQ 20 composition from Euronext

Euronext indices
Economy of the Republic of Ireland